Ramon Frederick Murnane (6 September 1937 – 25 February 2013) was an Australian rules footballer who played with Collingwood in the Victorian Football League (VFL).

Notes

External links 

Ray Murnane's playing statistics from The VFA Project

1937 births
Australian rules footballers from Victoria (Australia)
Collingwood Football Club players
Preston Football Club (VFA) players
2013 deaths